Oklahoma Gas & Electric Company (branded as OG+E or "O-G-and-E") is a regulated electric utility company that serves over 843,000 customers in Oklahoma and Arkansas, including 1.5 million people in the Oklahoma City Metropolitan Area. It is the leading subsidiary of OGE Energy Corp., with headquarters in downtown Oklahoma City. OGE Energy is also the former parent of Enogex Inc., a natural gas pipeline business which merged with CenterPoint Energy's midstream business to form Enable Midstream in 2013, in 2021 OGE and CenterPoint sold their general partnership in Enable Midstream to Energy Transfer.  OGE Energy and its subsidiaries have about 3,100 employees.

History

OG&E was founded in 1902, five years before Oklahoma became a state. It merged with Enogex in 1986. In 1997, OG&E reorganized as a holding company, OGE Energy, with OG&E and Enogex (now part of Enable Midstream) as its operating companies.

OG&E
OG&E Electric Services serves more than 850,000 customers in central and western Oklahoma and western Arkansas, and has no current wholesale power commitments.  OG&E, with seven power plants is capable of producing about 6,100 megawatts from fossil fuels, also owns three wind farms and two small solar farms. OG&E also has long-term power purchase agreements with three non-owned wind farms. In 2017 OG&E generated 54% of electricity from low-sulfur Wyoming coal and 39 percent from natural gas with the remaining 7 percent coming from renewables, mostly wind.

OG&E owns roughly 450 megawatts of wind power. Under the plan announced on October 29, 2007, President and CEO Peter Delaney announced that wind power could be increased to about 770 MW.

OG&E is the largest electric utility in the state of Oklahoma. The company delivers all of its electricity across an interconnected transmission and distribution system spanning . OG&E is a member of the Southwest Power Pool, a regional transmission operator spanning the Midwest from Texas to North Dakota.

OG&E was the first electric company in Oklahoma to offer wind power as a choice to its retail customers in 2003.

In December 2016, OG&E announced that it gave out $7.5 million in "energy efficiency incentives to businesses, schools and government buildings in 2016." A total of 750 organizations benefited from the project. Secondary schools received around $650,000; universities received around $365,000. In one school district, 1 million kWh were cut down through energy-saving projects.

Enogex
Enogex is engaged in natural gas gathering, processing, transportation, storage and marketing.
In 2013, it was decided that Enogex would be merged with a portion of CenterPoint Energy's operations in a limited partnership to be called Enable Midstream Partners.

OGE Energy Resources
OGE Energy Resources conducts the company's energy marketing and related activities. Operating in the national commodities markets for electricity and natural gas, Energy Resources' primary role is to optimize the generation, transmission and pipeline assets of OGE Energy.

References

External links
OGE Energy Corp.

Electric power companies of the United States
Natural gas companies of the United States
Petroleum in Oklahoma
Companies based in Oklahoma City
Non-renewable resource companies established in 1902
1902 establishments in Oklahoma Territory
Companies listed on the New York Stock Exchange